Casey Fitzgerald may refer to:
Casey Fitzgerald (American football) (born 1985), American college football player
Casey Fitzgerald (ice hockey) (born 1997), American ice hockey player